Tafadzwa Musakwa (born 22 May 1984) is a Zimbabwean cricket umpire. He has stood in matches in the 2017–18 Logan Cup and the 2017–18 Pro50 Championship tournaments. He also stood in 2022 Zimbabwe Domestic Twenty20 Competition.

He umpired his first international match in 2021, in the ODI series between Zimbabwe women and Ireland women.

References

External links
 
 

1984 births
Living people
Zimbabwean cricket umpires
Sportspeople from Harare